"Rooftop" is a song by Swedish singer Zara Larsson from her debut studio album, 1 and her international debut EP, Uncover. It was released digitally on 15 September 2014. Since its release, it has since peaked at number six in Sweden, and has been certified Platinum by the GLF.

Music video
A music video was released on 26 September 2014 and was directed by Måns Nyman.

Track listing

Charts

Weekly charts

Certifications

Release history

References

2013 songs
2014 singles
Zara Larsson songs
Songs written by Billboard (record producer)
Songs written by Rickard Göransson
Songs written by Marcus Sepehrmanesh